, real name , was a Japanese screenwriter. He often worked with Yoshishige Yoshida and also penned scripts for Ultraman and other episodes in the Ultra series.

He died of lung cancer in Shinjuku, Tokyo, on 10 August 2005 at the age of 74.

Selected filmography
 Eros Plus Massacre (1969)

References

External links 

1931 births
2005 deaths
Deaths from lung cancer in Japan
20th-century Japanese screenwriters